Lady Charles Cavendish-Bentinck (born Anne Wellesley; 29 February 1788 – 19 March 1875), known between 1806 and 1816 as Lady Abdy, was a British aristocrat and a great-great-grandmother of Queen Elizabeth II.

Background

She was a daughter of Richard Wellesley, 1st Marquess Wellesley, and his mistress, Hyacinthe-Gabrielle Roland, an actress at the Palais Royal. Her parents were married six years after her birth, on 29 March 1794, at which point she was legitimised.

Her paternal grandparents were Garret Wesley, 1st Earl of Mornington, and Anne Hill, daughter of Arthur Hill-Trevor, 1st Viscount Dungannon.

Her paternal uncles included Arthur Wellesley, 1st Duke of Wellington, William Wellesley-Pole, 3rd Earl of Mornington, and Henry Wellesley, 1st Baron Cowley.

Marriages and children
On 3 July 1806, she married her first husband, Sir William Abdy, 7th Baronet. Their marriage lasted nine years, but remained childless.

Abdy had introduced her to his friend Lord Charles Cavendish-Bentinck, a younger son of former British Prime Minister William Cavendish-Bentinck, 3rd Duke of Portland. At some point during her first marriage, Anne and Lord Charles became lovers. They eloped on 5 September 1815, following which Abdy brought a suit for criminal conversation ("crim. con.", in Regency parlance) for 30,000 pounds, but won only 7,000 pounds in damages. During the discussion of the divorce bill, the customary provision against remarriage was struck out in the House of Lords. Sir William Abdy was granted a divorce by royal consent to a special Act of Parliament on 25 June 1816.

Anne and Lord Charles were married on 23 July 1816, enabling their first child (which she was expecting) to be born legitimate three weeks later. They had four children:
Anne Hyacinthe Cavendish-Bentinck (1 September 1816 – 7 June 1888)
Emily Cavendish-Bentinck (died 6 June 1850), who married the Rev. Henry Hopwood and had children.
The Reverend Charles William Frederick Cavendish-Bentinck (8 November 1817 – 17 August 1865):
Father to Cecilia Nina Cavendish-Bentinck, maternal grandfather to Elizabeth Bowes-Lyon and great-grandfather to Queen Elizabeth II.
Lt.-Gen. Arthur Cavendish-Bentinck (10 May 1819 – 11 December 1877):
He married firstly Elizabeth Sophia Hawkins-Whitshed; they were parents of William Cavendish-Bentinck, 6th Duke of Portland.
He married secondly Augusta Browne, 1st Baroness Bolsover; they were parents of Lady Ottoline Morrell.

Ancestors

References

External links
 Her profile at Worldroots.com
A Right Royal Scandal: Two marriages that changed history

1788 births
1875 deaths
Anne
Daughters of British marquesses
Anne Wellesley
Women of the Regency era
Wives of baronets
Wives of younger sons of peers
English people of French descent
18th-century British people
18th-century British women
19th-century British people
19th-century British women